Michael Butler Yeats (22 August 1921 – 3 January 2007) was an Irish barrister and Fianna Fáil politician. He served two periods as a member of Seanad Éireann.

His father was the poet W. B. Yeats, who likewise served in the Seanad, and his mother was Georgie Hyde-Lees. His sister Anne Yeats was a painter and designer, as was his uncle Jack Butler Yeats. Michael was educated at St Columba's College, Dublin and Trinity College Dublin, where he gained first class honours degree in History. He was an officer in the College Historical Society. He also qualified as a lawyer but did not practise.

He unsuccessfully stood for election to Dáil Éireann at the 1948 general election and the 1951 general election for the Dublin South-East constituency. Following the 1951 election, Yeats was nominated to the 7th Seanad by the Taoiseach Éamon de Valera. He stood at the subsequent election in 1954 for the 8th Seanad but was not elected.

From 1961 to 1980 he was a member of Seanad Éireann. In 1961 he was elected to the 10th Seanad by the Labour Panel. In 1965 he was nominated by the Taoiseach Seán Lemass to the 11th Seanad. In 1969 he was elected to the 12th Seanad by the Cultural and Educational Panel, and re-elected to the 13th Seanad in 1973. In 1977, he was nominated by the Taoiseach Jack Lynch to the 14th Seanad. He resigned from the Seanad on 12 March 1980.

From 1969 to 1973, during the 12th Seanad, he served as Cathaoirleach (chair).

While a senator, Yeats served as a Member of the European Parliament from 1973 to 1979, being appointed to Ireland's first, second and third delegations. He stood at the first direct elections in 1979 for the Dublin constituency but was not elected. He was Director General of the EEC Council of Ministers in Brussels in the 1980s.

He was married to Gráinne Ni hEigeartaigh, a singer and Irish harpist. They had four children; three daughters and a son.

See also
Families in the Oireachtas

References

Sources
Cast a Cold Eye (autobiography), Dublin: Blackwater Press, .

1921 births
2007 deaths
Auditors of the College Historical Society
Fianna Fáil senators
Cathaoirligh of Seanad Éireann
Members of the 7th Seanad
Members of the 10th Seanad
Members of the 11th Seanad
Members of the 12th Seanad
Members of the 13th Seanad
Members of the 14th Seanad
Michael
People educated at St Columba's College, Dublin
Fianna Fáil MEPs
MEPs for the Republic of Ireland 1977–1979
MEPs for the Republic of Ireland 1973–1977
MEPs for the Republic of Ireland 1973
People from Thame
Nominated members of Seanad Éireann
Alumni of Trinity College Dublin